Bellman's Cave is a cave in the British Overseas Territory of Gibraltar.  It is named after Captain William Bellman who was stationed in Gibraltar during the Second World War.  Its entrance is located on Signal Station Road in the Gibraltar Nature Reserve, directly beneath the top Cable Car station. The tunnel contains the remains of accommodation that was installed for the gunners of the Signal Hill Battery.

The tunnel which runs from east to west contains a hollowed out interior which is six by twelve metres. Within this space are the remains of a Nissen hut. The small tunnel also contains cooking and other abandoned facilities.

See also
List of caves in Gibraltar

References

Caves of Gibraltar